The Duke Lemur Center is an  sanctuary for rare and endangered strepsirrhine primates, located at Duke University in Durham, North Carolina. It is the largest sanctuary for strepsirrhine primates in the world.

The center is open to the public through tours, for which visitors must make an appointment.

History

In 1966, a prosimian colony of approximately 90 individuals, belonging to John Buettner-Janusch, was relocated from the Center for Prosimian Biology at Yale University to Duke University, creating the Duke Lemur Center (DLC). Through the 1970s, the colony grew to approximately 700 individuals representing 33 species. The current colony ranges between 250 and 300 animals, representing approximately 25 species. Originally called the Duke University Primate Center (DUPC), the center's name was changed in April 2006 after a refocusing of the scientific goals and overall mission. Specimens from its scientific collection may thus be assigned the code DPC.

The mission of the Duke University Lemur Center is to "promote research and understanding of prosimians and their natural habitat as a means of advancing the frontiers of knowledge, to contribute to the educational development of future leaders in international scholarship and conservation and to enhance the human condition by stimulating intellectual growth and sustaining global biodiversity."

According to Duke University, the Lemur Center, the only university-based facility in the world devoted to the study of strepsirrhine primates, "is home to the world's largest colony of endangered primates – including more than 200 lemurs, bush babies and lorises.... More than 85 percent of the center's inhabitants were born on site."

In 1997, the center began a program to reintroduce black-and-white ruffed lemurs into the  Betampona Natural Reserve in Madagascar, the first return of any prosimian primates to the island nation.

In 2009 and 2010, the center completed two new buildings for housing lemurs. It can house up to 60 animals that can be released into the  Duke Forest if weather permits. Together, they are able to house 140 lemurs. The buildings are designed with animal housing wings radiating from a central core which houses common resources like laboratories, exam rooms, food prep, bathrooms, and storage spaces. Both buildings are designed for low water and electricity use, and are LEED registered. The total cost of the two-buildings, designed by architects Lord, Aeck & Sargent of Chapel Hill, North Carolina, was $10.4 million.

Zoboomafoo 

The children's television show Zoboomafoo, produced by the Public Broadcasting Service (PBS), was filmed at the Duke Lemur Center. In order to film the show, a custom-made animal sound stage was constructed on the Duke University campus. One of the show's hosts Martin Kratt, holds a degree in Zoology from Duke University.

On 10 November 2014, Jovian the Coquerel's sifaka (best known for mainly portraying Zoboomafoo in the series of the same name), died of renal failure in his home at the Duke Lemur Center at the age of 20.

References

External links

 
 Duke University
 Nature: The Loneliest Animals (Chapter 4): Lemur survival in captivity at the Duke Lemur Center

Primate research centers
Lemur Center
Primate sanctuaries
1966 establishments in North Carolina
Lemurs